Richard Handcock, 2nd Baron Castlemaine (14 May 1767 – 18 April 1840), known as Richard Handcock until 1839, was an Irish peer and politician.

Background and education
Castlemaine was a younger son of the Very Reverend Richard Handcock, Dean of Archonry, and Sarah, daughter of Richard Toler. William Handcock, 1st Viscount Castlemaine, was his elder brother. He was educated at Trinity College, Dublin.

Political career
Castlemaine was a Member of the Irish House of Commons for Athlone from May 1800 until the Act of Union in 1801, alongside his elder brother, William. In 1839 he succeeded his elder brother as second Baron Castlemaine according to a special remainder in the letters patent. However, as this was an Irish peerage it did not entitle him to a seat in the House of Lords.

Family
Lord Castlemaine married Anne, daughter of Arthur French, in 1790. They had seven sons and two daughters.  He died after a long illness in April 1840, aged 72, and was succeeded in the barony by his eldest son, Richard. Lady Castlemaine died in November 1852.

His daughter Anne married Sempronius Stretton.  His daughter Sarah married Major General Christopher Hamilton CB.

Arms

References

1767 births
1840 deaths
Alumni of Trinity College Dublin
Richard 2
Irish MPs 1798–1800
Members of the Parliament of Ireland (pre-1801) for Athlone